The Basilica of St Therese of the Child Jesus is a Roman Catholic minor basilica in Cairo, Egypt, dedicated to Thérèse of Lisieux. The foundation stone of the church was laid in 1931 and the construction was finished in 1932. The church is under the circumscription of the Apostolic Vicariate of Alexandria of Egypt. It was decreed basilica on July 8, 1972. Saint Therese is well known among both Egyptian Catholics and Copts. Hundreds of votive tablets covering the walls of the crypt testify the granted intercession of the saint. The metro station close to the basilica is named after Saint Theresa.

Literature 
 Manfred Karl Böhm: Eine beliebte Pilgeroase an den Ufern des Nils. Das Heiligtum "St. Theresia vom Kinde Jesus" in Kairo, in: Theresien-Kalender 1995 (70. Jahrgang), S.43-44.

References

External links 
 Description and image (discalcedcarmel.com)

Basilica churches in Egypt
Churches in Cairo
Roman Catholic churches in Egypt
1932 establishments in Egypt
20th-century Roman Catholic church buildings
20th-century churches in Egypt
Roman Catholic churches completed in 1932